Tibial arteries may refer to:

 Anterior tibial artery
 Posterior tibial artery